Jakub Jantulík (born 3 September 1994 in Čadca) is a Grand Prix motorcycle racer from Slovakia.

Career statistics

By season

Races by year
(key)

References

External links
 Profile on motogp.com

1994 births
Living people
Slovak motorcycle racers
125cc World Championship riders
People from Čadca
Sportspeople from the Žilina Region